The women's 1500 metres at the 2013 World Championships in Athletics was held at the Luzhniki Stadium on 11–15 August.

From the start of the final, two Americans, defending champion Jennifer Simpson and super high-schooler Mary Cain bracketed the field and closed to fill in the front of the pack. But most of the pack stayed in close order formation throughout with much jockeying for position and flying elbows. Cain tried to stay on the curb but kept getting moved back as new suitors moved forward then fell back. Zoe Buckman came forward then went to the curb to suffer the same fate ahead of Cain. Throughout world leader Abeba Aregawi hovered near the front but not passing Simpson. With 300 to go, Aregawi went around Simpson and made a break for it. But Simpson and the rest of the pack didn't go away. Just 100 meters later, Simpson looked like she would go by, but Aregawi wouldn't let her by. Then Hellen Onsando Obiri moved up with momentum, but couldn't make her way around either of them. Aregawi gained a couple of steps around the final turn, but Simpson came back to make it a close finish. Obiri lost ground but held on to keep the bronze. Faith Chepngetich Kipyegon tried to hang on to her teammate but Hannah England made an impressive run from back in the pack to pass her on the inside to get fourth.

Records
Prior to the competition, the records were as follows:

Qualification standards

Schedule

Results

Heats
Qualification: First 6 in each heat (Q) and the next 6 fastest (q) advanced to the semifinals.

Semifinals
Qualification: First 5 in each heat (Q) and the next 2 fastest (q) advanced to the final.

Final
The final was started at 21:20.

References

External links
1500 metres results at IAAF website

1500 metres
1500 metres at the World Athletics Championships
2013 in women's athletics